The Central District of Naqadeh County is in West Azerbaijan province, Iran. At the National Census in 2006, its population was 96,087 in 23,056 households. The following census in 2011 counted 100,284 people in 27,739 households. At the latest census in 2016, the district had 106,524 inhabitants in 31,358 households.

References 

Naqadeh County

Districts of West Azerbaijan Province

Populated places in West Azerbaijan Province

Populated places in Naqadeh County